Nicholas Nelson Sutton (born 18 August 1969) is an English property developer.

Biography
Sutton was born 18 August 1969 in Birchington, Kent. He attended Sompting Abbotts Preparatory School in Worthing, West Sussex from 1975 to 1983, Brighton College from 1983 to 1988, and the University of Exeter from 1988 to 1991. He is a member of the Institute of Chartered Accountants and a member of the Institute of Taxation.

Career
He set up his first company, Imperial Property Co, in 1997 while at university. Sutton joined Arthur Andersen in London where he trained and qualified as an accountant. After training with Arthur Andersen he joined Dilmun Investment Advisors Ltd, a subsidiary of Bahrain International Bank, in November 1994 as Assistant Director Real Estate Investment Banking.

In 1995 he set up Crown Dilmun on behalf of his employer, to specialise in inner-city residential projects in London, Glasgow, Manchester, Bristol, Newcastle and Brighton. He specialised in turning listed buildings into modern high-specification apartments. While Managing Director of Crown Dilmun he negotiated development of the  Harrods Depository site in Trevor Square, Knightsbridge, which was bought from Mohamed Al-Fayed for £52.5 million in 2001. The Grade II listed building was converted into residential and commercial spaces in a £140 million project.
 
In November 2002, he left Crown Dilmun. In January 2003 he was revealed as the person behind the agreement to purchase Craven Cottage, the home of Fulham Football Club, from club owner Mohamed Al-Fayed, for £50 million. The deal failed, and the proposal was the subject of a court battle between Sutton and Crown Dilmun  which culminated in a twelve-day case in the High Court in December 2003. The resulting judgment found in favour of Crown Dilmun, with Mr Justice Peter Smith finding that Sutton had breached the fiduciary duties that he owed his then employer. Sutton did not appeal.

In July 2012, the Royal York Hotel, owned by his company Imperial Property, went into administration. This was followed by another hotel owned by the company, The Lansdowne Place, going into administration owing millions and weddings planned to take place at the venue.

In December 2017, a tenant complained to Norwich City Council due to broken heating and "freezing conditions" in a block of flats in the city owned by Sutton's Faiths Lane Apartments Ltd. Upon inspection 528 electrical defects were found. The council handed Sutton eight improvement notices and upon inspection in June, the council found that five of the notices had not been met. Local press coverage showed pictures of damp, mouldy walls with holes in ceilings where there had been leaks. Norwich City Council ordered all tenants to leave the unsafe flats. A tribunal in March 2020 ruled that Sutton and his company pay a total of £174,000 due to the breaches of regulations and failure to comply with notices.

Personal life
He met Ayşe Gülnev Osmanoğlu  while studying at University. They married in 1994 and had five children..

References

English chief executives
Academics of the University of Exeter
Living people
1969 births